Miklós Kásler (born 1 March 1950) is a Hungarian oncologist, professor, director of the National Institute of Oncology, and Minister of Human Resources from 2018 to 2022.

Life

His father, Dr István Kásler (born 1918, Déva (now Romania) was a jurist and his mother, Aranka Boda (born 1923, Sárvár) was a pedagogue. On his father's side he has Bukovina German and Bukovina Székely ancestors from Andrásfalva.

He was born in Budapest, but the family moved to Sárvár, so he attended the primary and secondary schools there. Later he studied medicine at the University of Szeged and graduated in 1974. Then he took exams in surgery (1978), oral surgery (1988), plastic and reconstructional surgery (1998) and oncology (2009).

From 1969, he worked in the Institute of Medical Chemistry of the University of Szeged as demonstrator and from 1971 in the Microbiology Institute as a TDK member. He became a clinical physician in 1974 at the No. 2 Surgeon Clinic and from 1978 an instructor.

He came to the National Oncological Institute in 1981 where he became lecturer in 1984 and chief medical officer of the head-neck surgery department in 1986. He was nominated to director of the institute. He established the National Cancer Control Program for the heterogeneous medical care of cancer patients in 1993.

Since 1994 he became professor at the Semmelweis University and head of department at three universities (Semmelweis University, University of Pécs, University of Medicine and Pharmacy of Târgu Mureș) since 1998. Since 2007 he was director of the oncological department of the University of Pécs. His scientific degrees are doctoral candidate (1984), Doctor of MTA (2010), member of the European Academy of Sciences and Arts (2017).

During his scientific activity he wrote 16 professional books, 7 books, 76 book parts, more than 250 in and internationally published announcements and gave lectures on many national and international occasions on several institutes.

Public activity
He always showed great interest in Hungarian history and historical fate questions. His opinion is that the human of today has lost his way and his values. A kind of moral interregnum is formed when a part of the old classical, through century defecated values is lost by the humans and is now looking for a way to the solution.

He appeared in a talk show on M1, a government-controlled national television channel with similarly-thinking guests (writers, scientists, and philosophers) on a series of interviews about national fate with the title Nemzeti nagyvizit.

He was a special guest of the 777blog.hu Christian public portal interview series in March 2018, when he explained how the scientists serve God and science at the same time, so serving God through science. He also gave his point of view detailed on the issue:

Kásler was a member of an international research group which came up with a result on the controversial prehistory of Hungarians which confirmed the fact that the members of the Árpád dynasty are certainly from the Eurasian blood line, as genetic markers can be used to map the pharynx genetic history. Researchers determined Béla III's genetic profile on his father's line. The research team concluded that Béla III's DNA fragment extracted from his bone belongs to the typically co-inherited R1a haplotype. This "finding" neither falls within his area of medical expertise (genetic analysis is not part of cancer medicine), nor does it have anything with the "origin of Hungarians," which is an "interpretation" Kásler and his fan base attribute to it. 

In April 2018, Kásler was appointed Minister of Human Resources.

Awards

 Krompecher Medallion (1999)
 Endre Mester Medallion (2001)
 Aurél Réthy Medallion (2001)
 Markusovszky Kórház Jubileum Plaque (2004)
 László Batthyány-Strattmann Award (2005)
 World Council of Hungarian Professors Pro Universitate et Scientia (2005)
 Diploma Honori (University of Medicine and Pharmacy of Târgu Mureș, 2005)
 Markusovszky Plaque (2006)
 Doktor Honoris Causa (University of Medicine and Pharmacy of Târgu Mureș, 2006)
 Order of Merit of the Republic of Hungary - Commander's Cross (2007)
 Lajos Markusovszky Award (2008)
 Prima Award (2008)
 Lajos Markusovszky Award and Diploma (2010)
 Honorary Citizen of Budapest (2011)
 Orvosi Hetilap Markusovszky Lajos Award (2012)
 Honorary Citizen of Sárvár (2012)
 Diploma of Fellowship of Royal College of Physicians and Surgeons of Glasgow (2012)
 Physician Weekly - Lajos Markusovszky Award (2013)
 Order of Merit of the Republic of Hungary - Commander's Cross with Star (2015)
 Conscience of the Hungarian Nation Award (2017)
 Honorary Perpetual Member of the Hungarian Oncologist Society (2017)
 Order of Saint Lazarus - Gold Medallion (2018)
 Ministerial Recognition Certificate (2018)
 Széchenyi Award (2018)

Works
 Kásler Miklós: Az onkológia alapjai. Budapest: MEDICINA KÖNYVKIADÓ zRT. 2011. 
 Kásler Miklós: Nemzeti nagyvizit. Földesi Margit, Kővári Péter, Szabados György. Kairosz. 2014. 
 Géczi Lajos – Kásler Miklós: Prosztatarák - Gyakorlati kézikönyv. Budapest: ZAFÍR PRESS. 2014. 
 Kásler Miklós: A komplex onkodiagnosztika és onkoterápia irányelvei. Budapest: SEMMELWEIS KIADÓ. 2008. 
 Kásler Miklós: Onkoterápiás protokoll. Budapest: SPRINGER TUDOMÁNYOS KIADÓ. 1996. 
 Dr. Igazvölgyi Katalin – Kásler Miklós – Dr. Szűcs Miklós: A rákról röviden: Veszélyeztető tényezők - korai felismerés - VESZÉLYEZTETŐ TÉNYEZŐK - KORAI FELISMERÉS. Budapest: SPRINGMED KIADÓ KFT. 2004. 
 Kásler Miklós – Dr. Pete Imre: Nőgyógyászati onkológia: Gyakorlati kézikönyv. Budapest: ZAFÍR PRESS. 2012. 
 Várszegi Asztrik – Kásler Miklós – Iván László: Gondolatok a „jó öregséghez”: Várszegi Asztrik és Kásler Miklós előadása, Iván László előszavával. Budapest: Gondolat kiadó. 2010.

Publications
 Kásler, Miklós and Ottó, Szabolcs : Európai és hazai kihívások az onkológiában, Magyar Onkológia, 2008

References

1950 births
Physicians from Budapest
Living people
Members of the Fourth Orbán Government
Hungarian Roman Catholics
Hungarian oncologists
Hungarian people of German descent
Government ministers of Hungary